Wolfgang Groß (born 30 March 1954) is a German coxswain. He won a gold medal at the 1974 World Rowing Championships in Lucerne with the men's coxed four, with the rowers Andreas Schulz, Rüdiger Kunze, and twin brothers Ullrich and Walter Dießner. A year later, he came second with the same team at the 1975 World Rowing Championships. The coxed four rowers stayed together for the 1976 Summer Olympics, but Groß was replaced as coxswain by Johannes Thomas. That team won Olympic silver at the coxed four event.

References

1954 births
Living people
German male rowers
World Rowing Championships medalists for East Germany
Coxswains (rowing)